Tribuswinkel is a town and cadastral community in the district of Baden in Lower Austria in northeast Austria. Since 1972, it is part of the commune of Traiskirchen.

Gallery

References

External links 
 www.tribuswinkel.at - city website

Cities and towns in Baden District, Austria